Corey lactone 4-phenylbenzoate is a synthetic intermediate used in the manufacture of some prostaglandin derivatives. It has been used as a false name by some designer drug manufacturers as a label to sell substituted cathinone derivatives after the banning of mephedrone and related drugs in some jurisdictions - but there is no evidence to suggest that Corey lactone 4-phenylbenzoate has any stimulant effects in its own right.

See also 
 2,3,4,5-Tetrahydro-1,5-methano-1H-3-benzazepine

References 

Lactones